State Route 205 (SR 205) is a  state highway that serves as a connection between the towns of Guntersville in Marshall County and Boaz in Etowah County. The highway serves as an alternate to U.S. Route 431 (US 431) through the area.

Route description

The southern terminus is at an intersection with US 431 in Sardis City. From this point, the highway travels in a northerly direction through Boaz and Albertville prior to turning to the northwest en route to its northern terminus at another intersection with US 431 near Guntersville.

History
SR 205 is routed along the roadway formerly designated as U.S. Route 241. During the 1940s, US 241 was relocated to the current routing of US 431. US 241 was changed to US 431 in 1953. In 2006, the portion of SR 205 in Etowah County is called The Jack Toney Memorial Highway.

Major intersections

References

205
Transportation in Etowah County, Alabama
Transportation in Marshall County, Alabama